Sulkowicz is a surname. Notable people with the surname include:

 Ed Sulkowicz (born 1954), Australian rugby league footballer
 Emma Sulkowicz (born 1992), American artist and activist
 Kerry Sulkowicz (born 1958), American psychiatrist and psychoanalyst

Polish-language surnames